Alhama (Alfama in Portuguese) can refer to:
 Alhama de Almería, a town in the province of Almería in Spain
 Alhama de Aragón, a town in the province of Zaragoza in Spain
 Alhama de Granada, a town in the province of Granada in Spain
 Alhama de Murcia, a town in the province of Murcia in Spain
 Alhama (river), a tributary of the Ebro which starts in the Montes del Cierzo and ends in the municipal baths at Castejón de Ebro in Navarra, Spain
 Alfama, a neighborhood in Lisbon, Portugal